Bowring Ranch State Historical Park is a state park of Nebraska, USA, interpreting the ranching heritage of the Sand Hills region and the lives of former owners Arthur and Eva Bowring (the first female U.S. Senator from Nebraska).

The ranch was  founded in 1894.  Arthur and Eva met when her car broke down near his ranch and he came to her assistance. They married in 1928 and kept the ranch running while each served in a variety of public offices. Eva Bowring maintained ranch operations on her own from Arthur's death in 1944 to her own in 1985. Concerned that it would be fragmented to new owners, the former Senator willed her ranch to the state in memory of her husband. The ranch continues to be operated as a working Hereford cattle ranch. The ranch house and outbuildings have been preserved, and a large visitor center documenting the Bowrings' lives is on the site.

References

External links
Bowring Ranch State Historical Park Nebraska Game and Parks Commission

Biographical museums in Nebraska
Historic house museums in Nebraska
Houses in Nebraska
Museums in Cherry County, Nebraska
State parks of Nebraska
Protected areas established in 1987
Protected areas of Cherry County, Nebraska
Ranches in Nebraska
1987 establishments in Nebraska